The 2018 6 Hours of Shanghai was an endurance sports car racing event held at the Shanghai International Circuit, Shanghai, China on 16–18 November 2018. Shanghai served as the fifth round of the 2018-19 FIA World Endurance Championship, and was the seventh running of the event, all part of the championship. The race was won by the #7 Toyota TS050 Hybrid.

Qualifying

Qualifying Results
Poles position winners in each class are marked in bold

Race

Race Result
The minimum number of laps for classification (70% of the overall winning car's distance) was 80 laps. Class winners in bold

Standings after the race

2018–2019 LMP World Endurance Drivers' Championship

2018–2019 LMP1 World Endurance Championship

 Note: Only the top five positions are included for the Drivers' Championship standings.

2018–2019 World Endurance GTE Drivers' Championship

2018–2019 World Endurance GTE Manufacturers' Championship

 Note: Only the top five positions are included for the Drivers' Championship standings.

References

External links 
 

Shanghai
Shanghai
6 Hours of Shanghai
November 2018 sports events in China